Star vs. the Forces of Evil is a television series created by Daron Nefcy and produced by Disney Television Animation. The series centers on fourteen-year-old Star Butterfly, a magical princess from the dimension of Mewni who is sent to Earth by her parents, King River and Queen Moon Butterfly, when they decide she should learn to wield magic away from their world. As an exchange student on Earth, she boards at the house of Marco Diaz whom she befriends as they both attend high school. Before the series was picked up, Nefcy had worked as an artist for Disney's Wander Over Yonder and Nickelodeon's Robot and Monster.

The first episode of the series premiered on January 18, 2015, on Disney Channel. Succeeding episodes premiered on Disney XD starting March 30, 2015. The series had been renewed for a second season a month before its Disney XD premiere. In March 2016, it was renewed for a third season prior to its second-season premiere scheduled for July that year. The episode "Bon Bon the Birthday Clown" marked the mid-season finale for the second season, according to Nefcy. The second half of the season aired entirely in February 2017 on weekdays, with either a half-episode segment or a full episode premiering each day. In the same month, the series was renewed for a fourth season. The show moved from Disney XD to Disney Channel for its fourth season, with reruns still airing on Disney XD.

A two-hour television film called The Battle for Mewni, which comprises the first four episodes of the third season upon being re-aired, premiered on July 15, 2017. The season concluded on April 7, 2018, with a two-part one hour finale. The fourth and final season premiered on March 10, 2019 on Disney Channel, and concluded on May 19, 2019.

Series overview

Episodes
Each episode is usually broken into two 11-minute segments.

Season 1 (2015)

Season 2 (2016–17)

Season 3 (2017–18)

Season 4 (2019)

Notes

References

Lists of American children's animated television series episodes
Lists of Disney Channel television series episodes
Star vs. the Forces of Evil